The 74th edition of the KNVB Cup started on August 31, 1991. The final was played on May 10, 1992: Feyenoord beat Roda JC 3–0 and won the cup for the eighth time.

Teams
 All 18 participants of the Eredivisie 1991-92, eleven of which entering in the third round, the rest entering in the second round
 All 20 participants of the Eerste Divisie 1991-92, entering in the second round
 24 teams from lower (amateur) leagues, five of which entering in the second round
 One youth team

First round
The matches of the first round were played on August 31 and September 1, 1991. Only amateur clubs and one youth team participated.

Second round
The matches of the second round were played on October 12, 1991. Except for eleven Eredivisie teams, all other participants entered the tournament this round.

E Eredivisie; 1 Eerste Divisie; A Amateur teams

Third round
The matches of the third round were played on November 16 and 17, 1991. The eleven highest ranked Eredivisie teams from last season entered the tournament here.

E eleven Eredivisie entrants

Round of 16
The matches of the round of 16 were played on January 4 and 5, 1992.

Quarter finals
The quarter finals were played on February 26, March 1 and March 8, 1992.

Semi-finals
The semi-finals were played on March 31 and April 8, 1992.

Final

Feyenoord would participate in the Cup Winners' Cup.

See also
Eredivisie 1991-92
Eerste Divisie 1991-92

External links
 Netherlands Cup Full Results 1970–1994 by the RSSSF
 Results by Ronald Zwiers  

1991-92
1991–92 domestic association football cups
1991–92 in Dutch football